The following is a list of notable current and former hotels in Washington, D.C..

Entries in bold are listed on the National Register of Historic Places.

Current hotels

Former hotels
This includes buildings that no longer exist as a whole or no longer operate with or as a hotel.

Notes

References